This is a list of the Croatian soccer players who played for the Croatia senior national football team, born outside Croatia. Most of them are born in the former Yugoslavia countries, especially Bosnia and Herzegovina, or outside Yugoslavia they're born in Germany. In this list are included naturalized players and born abroad.

Players in bold are currently playing for the Croatia national football team or active, in brackets there are their caps. The list is updated as 17 December 2022.

Australia 
 Joey Didulica 2004–2006 (4) (0)
 Anthony Šerić 1998–2006 (16) (0)
 Josip Šimunić 2001–2013 (105) (3)

Austria 
 Mateo Kovačić 2013– (91) (3)
Luka Sučić 2021– (4) (0)

Bosnia and Herzegovina

Austria-Hungary 
 Miroslav Brozović 1940–1944 (17) (0)
 Mirko Kokotović 1941–1944 (15) (2)
 Antun Pogačnik 1941 (1) (0)
 Sulejman Rebac 1956 (1) (2)
 Aleksandar Živković 1940 (1) (0)

Kingdom of Yugoslavia 
 Florijan Matekalo 1940 (4) (1)

SFR Yugoslavia 
 Mladen Bartulović 2006–2009 (2) (0)
 Mario Bazina 2002 (1) (0)
 Stanko Bubalo 1999–2000 (2) (0)
 Ante Budimir 2020– (17) (1)
 Nino Bule 1999–2004 (3) (0)
 Vedran Ćorluka 2006–2018 (103) (4)
 Darko Dražić 1990–1991 (2) (0)
 Sejad Halilović 1994 (1) (0)
 Mato Jajalo 2014–2015
 Nikica Jelavić 2009–2014 (36) (6)
 Vedran Ješe 2006–2008 (2) (0)
 Krunoslav Jurčić 1997–2000 (21) (0)
 Goran Jurić 1997–1999 (15) (0)
 Marin Leovac 2014– (5) (0)
 Dejan Lovren 2009– (78) (5)
 Mato Neretljak 2001–2006 (10) (1)
 Željko Pavlović 1996–2001 (7) (0)
 Mladen Petrić 2001–2013 (45) (13)
 Mladen Romić 1992 (3) (0)
 Mario Stanić 1995–2003 (49) (7)
 Mario Tokić 1998–2006 (28) (0)
 Stjepan Tomas 1998–2006 (49) (1)
 Boris Živković 1999–2007 (39) (2)

Born after Bosnia's Independence from Yugoslavia 
 Jakov Filipović 2017– (3) (0)
 Nikola Katić 2017– (1) (0)
 Mirko Marić 2017– (1) (0)
 Ivan Šunjić 2017– (1) (0)
 Josip Šutalo 2022– (2) (0)

Brazil 

 Eduardo da Silva 2004–2014 (64) (29)
 Sammir 2012–2014 (7) (0)

Germany

West Germany 
 Ivo Iličević 2010–2013 (9) (1)
 Niko Kovač 1996–2008 (83) (14)
 Robert Kovač 1999–2009 (84) (0)
 Ivan Klasnić 2004–2011 (41) (12)
 Marijo Marić 2002–2004 (8) (1)
 Tomislav Marić 2002–2003 (9) (2)
 Robert Prosinečki 1994–2002 (49) (10)
 Filip Tapalović 2002 (3) (0)
 Vladimir Vasilj 1998–2002 (2) (0)

Born after German reunification 
 Antonio Čolak 2020– (3) (0)
 Mario Pašalić 2014– (50) (7)
 Marin Pongračić 2020– (5) (0)
Josip Stanišić 2021– (8) (0)

Kosovo

SFR Yugoslavia 
 Ardian Kozniku 1994–1998 (7) (2)
 Kujtim Shala 1990 (1) (0)

Montenegro

SFR Yugoslavia 
 Dževad Turković 1994–1995 (6) (0)

Serbia

Austria-Hungary 
 Svetozar Džanić 1941 (1) (0)

Slovenia

Kingdom of Yugoslavia 
 Antun Lokošek 1944 (1) (1)

SFR Yugoslavia 

 Srebrenko Posavec 2006 (1) (0)
 Gregor Židan 1990 (1) (0)

Switzerland 
 Ivan Rakitić 2007–2019 (106) (15)

United States of America 

 Zvonko Jazbec 1940 (3) (1)

Records 
This section is only about players born outside Croatia. Players in bold are currently active.

Most capped players

Top goalscorers

Stats by country of birth

References 

Croatia

Croatian diaspora
Association football player non-biographical articles
Croatia